Arthur Lynch (born June 17, 1990) is a former American football tight end. He was drafted by the Miami Dolphins in the fifth round of the 2014 NFL Draft. He played college football at Georgia.

Early years
Lynch attended Dartmouth High School in Dartmouth, Massachusetts. He is the grandson of legendary Football Coach and Athletic Director, Carlin Lynch, who coached at Dartmouth High School for 36 years, amassing a 202-79-9 record, winning 14 League Championships, 6 undefeated seasons, 5 Super Bowl appearances, winning 4 of them. Following his death in 2019, Lynch described his grandfather as the 'single greatest man he'd ever met.'

High School Career 
In his junior season, while primarily blocking for future University of Connecticut All-American and NFL running back, Jordan Todman, he caught 10 passes for 160 yards and two touchdowns to go along with 63 tackles and four sacks on defense. Dartmouth finished the regular season as Old Colony League Champions with an 11-1 record. They defeated Brockton High School in the State Semifinal 40-7 earning a spot in the Division-I Super Bowl vs. powerhouse Everett High School. They would lose that game in overtime 36-28.

As a senior, he had 16 catches for 249 yards and three touchdowns. On defense, he recorded 55 tackles, 11.0 TFLs, 4.5 sacks, 9 hurries, and 3 forced fumbles. They finished the regular season as undefeated Old Colony League Champions. They would once again face Brockton High School in the Division-I State Semifinal this time losing 20-13. Following the season Lynch was named to the Massachusetts High School Football Coaches Association All-State Super 26 team, named team captain, and his No. 88 jersey was retired in the Dartmouth High School Field House, which is named after his grandfather, Carlin Lynch. He played varsity basketball for Steve Gaspar, who is the winningest basketball coach in school history. He also served as Class President.

The 2008 Dartmouth High School Football team was represented by 5 Senior Captains all of whom would go on to play college football. Three of those individuals played at the Division-I FCS and FBS levels. Lynch at the University of Georgia, Quarterback/Safety, Sean Sylvia at Boston College, and Wide Receiver/Cornerback, Justin Mello at University of New Hampshire.

As a recruit, he was considered a four-star by Rivals.com, and the top rated recruit in Massachusetts, the second best tight end prospect nationally, and the 121st overall recruit in the country by Rivals. In the spring of 2008, he committed to Jeff Jagodzinski and the Boston College Eagles, the alma mater of both his mother and sister. After reopening his recruitment that summer, he would visit Florida, Georgia, NC State, North Carolina, Virginia, and Maryland. In August 2008, prior to the start of his senior season, he verbally committed to Mark Richt and the University of Georgia. On Wednesday, February 4, 2009, National Signing Day, he signed his National Letter of Intent to play for the Bulldogs who signed the #4 overall class in the country by Scout.com. He was named to the PrepStar All-America Team, SuperPrep All-American and All-New England Teams. He participated in the 2008 Under Armour All-America Game.

College career
Lynch attended the University of Georgia from 2009 to 2013. While at UGA, he was coached by Tight Ends Coach John Lilly, Offensive Coordinator Mike Bobo, and Head Coach Mark Richt.

2009 
With a lack of depth at the tight end position to start the 2009 season, Lynch would forgo a redshirt and appeared in 11 games alongside fellow true freshman Orson Charles, who would go on to earn Freshman All-America Honors. Lynch saw action in his first collegiate game on September 5, 2009, in 24-10 loss to Oklahoma State at Boone Pickens Stadium. He recorded his first catch on November 7, 2009 vs. Tennessee Tech and finished the game with 2 catches for 17 yards. He was named to the Athletic Director's Honor Roll for the Summer and Fall Semesters while earning Dean's List in the Summer Semester. Georgia finished the season with an 8-5 record and a 44-20 victory over Texas A&M in the Independence Bowl Game.

2010 
Lynch would redshirt during his sophomore season. He was named to SEC Academic Honor Roll.

2011 
Coming off his redshirt year, he appeared in 13 games primarily as a back-up to up All-American tight end and Mackey Award Finalist Orson Charles.  The 2011 Georgia Bulldogs were coming off their worst season of Mark Richt's tenure as Head Coach. They began the season ranked #22 in the USA Today Preseason's Coaches' Poll and opened the season in the Georgia Dome losing to #7 Boise State 35-21 in the Chick-fil-A Kickoff Game. The following week they hosted #12 South Carolina Gamecocks in Sanford Stadium losing the game 45-42 and falling to 0-2 on the season. Following the South Carolina loss, the Bulldogs went on to win 10 straight regular season games. On November 19, 2011 , Lynch made his first career start vs. Kentucky helping Georgia clinch their first SEC East title since 2005. Despite the turnaround, Georgia would lose the last 2 games of the 2011 campaign. On December 3, 2011, they lost to the #1 ranked LSU Tigers in the SEC Championship. Despite the loss, they earned a spot in a New Year's Six Bowl and played #12 Michigan State in the Gator Bowl, losing 33-30 in triple overtime. Georgia finished the season ranked #20 in the Coaches' Poll and #19 in the Associated Press Poll.

2012 
At the conclusion of the 2011 season, All-American Orson Charles declared for the NFL Draft paving the way for Lynch to become the starting tight end. Prior to 2012, Lynch was mostly used as a blocking tight end but by season's end he proved to be a reliable pass catcher finishing the year with 24 catches for 431 yards and 3 touchdowns while appearing in 14 games making 13 starts.

The Georgia Bulldogs entered the season ranked #6 by the USA Today's Coaches Poll. On September 15, 2012, Lynch would score his first collegiate touchdown against the Florida Atlantic Owls. He finished the game with 3 catches for 73 yards and a touchdown in 56-20 win. On November 11, 2012, Georgia shutout Auburn in the Deep South's Oldest Rivalry 38-0 to clinch their second straight SEC East Title and another trip to the SEC Championship Game. Lynch caught 3 passes for 29 yards in the game. Georgia won their final two regular season games, a 45-14 win against Georgia Southern followed by a 42-10 victory over in-state rival Georgia Tech claiming the "Governor's Cup." In the two games, Lynch recorded 3 catches for 68 yards and 3 catches for 36 yards respectively. They finished the regular season ranked #3 in the country.

His most notable play oft he season came on the last drive of the 2012 SEC Championship Game vs. the #2 ranked Alabama Crimson Tide, when he caught a 26-yard pass from his college roommate Aaron Murray. He ran the ball down to the 8-yard line before being tackled by Vinnie Sunseri. Instead of spiking the ball, the Georgia offense ran to the line to run a final play. Murray's pass, which was intended for Malcolm Mitchell, was tipped by Alabama linebacker CJ Mosley, and caught instead by Chris Conley. Conley was unable to get out of bounds to stop the clock. Time expired and Georgia would lose the game 32-28. Alabama went on to win the 2013 BCS National Championship, beating Notre Dame 42-14, for Nick Saban's third National Championship at Alabama and fourth overall as a head coach. Georgia would play Nebraska in the 2013 Capital One Bowl winning the game 45-31. Lynch caught 3 passes for 37 yards and a touchdown in the win. Following the 2012 season, Lynch was named to the Phil Steele's 2012 All-SEC 3rd Team, while also being awarded the Team's Most Improved Player at the end of the year GALA. Georgia finished the season ranked #4 and #5 by the Coaches' and AP Poll.

2013 
Prior to the 2013 season, Lynch was named to a number of Preseason All-America and All-SEC Teams including Phil Steele's, SB Nation's, Athlon Sports, Sporting News, among others. Additionally, he was named to the Mackey Award Pre-Season Watch-List, which goes to the nation's top tight end at conclusion of each College Football season. Lynch, alongside his roommate Aaron Murray and Garrison Smith, represented the University of Georgia football team at the 2013 SEC Media Days where Lynch was named to the Pre-Season Media Days All-SEC Team. Georgia was ranked #5 in both the preseason Coaches' and AP Poll.

During his senior season, Lynch appeared and started in 12 games. He caught 30 passes for 459 yards and led all receivers with 5 touchdowns. Georgia opened the season vs. their rival, #8 ranked Clemson Tigers, in Memorial Stadium, also known as 'Death Valley.' The game was picked for ESPN College Football GameDay game-of-the-week and was hosted by the show's signature crew which at the time included Chris Fowler, Lee Corso, Kirk Herbstreit, Desmond Howard, and former Georgia Football player, David Pollack. Georgia would lose the game 38-35 and Lynch would have 1 catch for 18 yards. The following week Georgia hosted #6 ranked-South Carolina, a game that featured eventual No. 1 Overall Pick, Jadeveon Clowney. Georgia beat the Gamecocks 41-30 and Lynch finished the game with 3 catches for 26 yards and a touchdown. On September 29, 2012, Georgia would host #6 ranked LSU Tigers. The game, which featured former Georgia Quarterback and Athens, GA native, Zach Mettenberger, was once again hosted by ESPN's College GameDay crew for the second time that season. The game centered around Aaron Murray and Mettenberger, who were recruited together to Georgia and were once roommates. Both Quarterbacks shined resulting in a 44-41 Georgia win following a 4th down stop by their defense ending a Zach Mettenberger-led 4th quarter comeback. Murray finished the game with 298 yards and 4 touchdowns with Lynch catching 3 passes for 40 yards. On Saturday, November 2, 2012, Lynch caught a pass from Aaron Murray and was tackled by Florida Linebacker Antonio Morrison lacerating his kidney and bruising several ribs. Despite passing blood through his urine he finished the game. He would miss the following game vs. Appalachian State due to a kidney laceration. It would be the only game he missed due to injury during his collegiate career.

The Bulldogs finished the regular season 8-4 and ranked No. 23 in the AP Poll. They earned a New Year's Six Bowl berth and accepted an invitation to play Nebraska in the TaxSlayer Gator Bowl. In his final collegiate game, Lynch would have one of his best statistical performances of his career catching 6 passes for 69 yards. However, he dropped a crucial pass that ended Georgia's potential 4th quarter game-winning drive. Georgia lost the game 24-19 and finished the season unranked.

Following the season, Lynch was named to the Associated Press, SEC Coaches, and Sporting News All-SEC 1st Team and was an ESPN All-America Honorable Mention. He was voted Offensive Team Captain by his teammates and finished his career with 56 receptions for 907 yards and eight touchdowns.

College Statistics

Professional career
At the conclusion of his college career, Lynch accepted an invitation to the Reese's Senior Bowl a post-season college football all-star game played annually in Mobile, Alabama, which showcases the best NFL Draft prospects of those players who have completed their college eligibility. He attended the NFL Scouting Combine in Indianapolis and participated in each of the field drills, along with the psychological, and medical tests. He finished Top-10 among tight ends in four separate categories including the second most bench press reps of 225 with 28, behind Joe Jon Duncan, of Dixie State. Leading up to the draft, analysts ranked Lynch as one of the top tight end prospects in the 2014 draft class. Greg Cosell, Senior Producer of NFL Films, compared him to long-time Pittsburgh Steelers tight end Heath Miller. He was a projected Day 3 selection by multiple outlets, including Bleacher Report.

Miami Dolphins
In the 2014 NFL Draft Lynch was selected in 5th round as 155th overall pick by the Dolphins. On May 22, 2014, he signed his rookie contract. A week following the draft, Lynch suffered a non-contact injury during the team's first on-field voluntary workout. On August 26, 2014, he was placed on injured reserve due to a partial fracture of the L4/L5 Lumbar Spine.

His position coach while in Miami was current Detroit Lions Head Coach Dan Campbell.

On August 17, 2014, he was waived following the first pre-season game of the 2015 season.

New York Jets
Lynch was claimed off waivers by the New York Jets on August 19, 2015. On September 5, 2015, he was waived.

Denver Broncos
On September 7, 2015, Lynch was signed to the Broncos' practice squad. On December 1, 2015, he was released from the practice squad.

Atlanta Falcons
On July 27, 2016, Lynch was signed by the Falcons. On August 27, 2016, Lynch was waived by the Falcons.

Retirement 
In October 2016, Lynch had a discectomy to remove a portion of an intervertebral disc. Weeks after surgery, fluid began leaking from the surgical wound and he was rushed to St. Luke's Hospital, in New Bedford, MA to undergo emergency surgery to remove the infected flesh. He spent 6 days in the hospital due to the severity of the infection. Prior to being discharged, in an effort to treat the lingering Strep Virus infection, they attached a peripherally inserted central catheter (PICC) line through his armpit. After 6-months of antibiotics and rehabilitation, Lynch officially retired from football.

Personal life
Raised by his mother, Carline Lynch, a single parent. He was the youngest of 4 children and the only boy. His oldest sister Elizabeth, was a student-athlete and graduate of Dartmouth College, where she ran track & field. His middle sister, Frances, attended Boston College, where she was also a member of the track & field teams. He was born Arthur Charles Fontaine II named after his great-grandfather on his father's side. When he was 14, his father left the family and upon entering high school he decided to legally change his name to honor both his mother and grandfather, Carlin Lynch. On his 18th birthday, "Artie," as his family and friends called him, submitted the appropriate paperwork and legally changed his name from Arthur Charles Fontaine II to Arthur Charles Lynch.

In 2018, following multiple rejections from both the United States Marines Corps and US Army, due to his medical history, he was accepted into the United States Army Officer Candidate School. He commissioned in 2019 and branched infantry.

An avid runner, Lynch ran the 2021 New York City Marathon representing Haymakers for Hope, a charitable organization focused on fighting cancer.

References

External links
 Georgia Bulldogs bio

1990 births
Living people
People from Dartmouth, Massachusetts
Players of American football from Massachusetts
Under Armour All-American football players
American football tight ends
Georgia Bulldogs football players
Miami Dolphins players
New York Jets players
Denver Broncos players
Atlanta Falcons players